The United States Naval Surface Warfare Center Dahlgren Division (NSWCDD), named for Rear Admiral John A. Dahlgren, is located in King George County, Virginia, in close proximity to the largest fleet concentration area in the Navy. NSWCDD is part of the Naval Surface Warfare Centers under the Naval Sea Systems Command (NAVSEA).  NSWCDD was initially established 16 October 1918 as a remote extension of Maryland's Indian Head Proving Ground used for testing naval guns. The Dahlgren site was named the Lower Station, Dahlgren Naval Proving Ground when it first opened. The location on the Potomac River was specifically chosen for the development of a long ballistic test range on the Potomac River, required for the testing of modern, high-powered munitions.

The NSWCDD employs approximately 4,700 scientists, engineers and support personnel at the Dalhgren organization and more than 350 at NSWCDD DNA. Prior to 2007, Panama City Coastal Systems Station located at the Naval Support Activity Panama City was part of Dahlgren Division, but in 2008, it became its own division within the NAVSEA Naval Surface Warfare Center structure.

The physical base where NSWCDD is located became officially known as the Naval Support Activity Dahlgren (NSA Dahlgren) in 2003 when Naval Installations Command assumed all base operating functions, leaving  NSWCDD as an installation tenant,  however, the name NSWCDD or NSWC is still commonly used to refer to the base. There are a few other major tenant commands on the base such as the Joint Warfare Analysis Center and the Aegis Training and Readiness Center (ATRC) involved in the training and development for the Aegis Combat System, and training and development for other future shipboard combat systems. NSF Dahlgren was also previously home to Naval Space Surveillance System Command (NAVSPASUR) before that function was transferred to the Air Force in 2004. In 2006, the installation's name was changed to its current iteration of Naval Support Facility Dahlgren when Naval District Washington merged it and Naval Support Activity Indian Head under the combined command of Naval Support Activity South Potomac.

The base is recognized by the Census Bureau as a census designated place (CDP), Dahlgren Center. Its population as of the 2010 Census was 599. It is entirely distinct from Dahlgren CDP, to the west.

History
Dahlgren was established in the spring of 1918 as a Naval Proving Ground. Its recorded first work, the firing of a /45 caliber tractor-mounted gun, occurred on 16 October 1918, which is recognized as the official founding date. The proving ground was named Dahlgren in honor of Rear Admiral John Adolphus Dahlgren, a Civil War Navy commander, who is the acknowledged "father of modern naval ordnance."

Prior to 1918, the Navy operated a proving ground at Indian Head, Maryland, but it became inadequate as advances in gun designs and ordnance made its range obsolete. The range was required to be over water but inside the territorial waters of the United States. The area from Machodoc Creek to Point Lookout on the Potomac River was selected because of its relative straight lines and accessibility. The climate and relative calm of the river were also factors as the Navy sought an ice and rapids free testing area.
At the time of Dahlgren's establishment, the area was extremely remote and relatively unpopulated. Thus, to recruit and retain the highly specialized work force required, the Navy promised to supply housing, food and medical services, schools, recreation, and other socially needed infrastructure.

In the 1920s and 1930s, Dahlgren was involved in testing bombsights, including the Norden bombsight, for the Navy's fledgling air forces. But, until World War II, much of the principal work at Dahlgren surrounded the proofing and testing of every major gun in the Navy's arsenal. Most of the work was done at the Main Range Gun Line, which faces down the Potomac River.

During the World War II years, Dahlgren became involved with new computational devices (computers) because of its ordnance requirements. Ground-breaking early computers were sent to Dahlgren to help with ballistic work and other directives, including the Aiken Relay Calculator and the Naval Ordnance Research Calculator (NORC). The computer and ordnance work going on attracted a number of brilliant young scientists and engineers to the area during the war, and some were tapped to help with the ongoing Manhattan Project and the development of the atomic bomb. Two such people include Dr. Norris E. Bradbury, who later became the Director of the Los Alamos National Laboratory, and Deak Parsons, the weaponeer on the Enola Gay, the aircraft which dropped the Little Boy atomic bomb on Hiroshima, Japan in 1945.

In the years immediately after the war, Dahlgren's work force was cut back. But the laboratory's strong computer and ordnance expertise kept the base open and Navy work flowing. Subsequently, the onset of the Cold War and Korea again placed demands for new offensive and defensive ship systems. In 1958, with the former Soviet Union's launching of Sputnik I, a space race began. Dahlgren opened its gates that year to its first tenant activity, the Naval Space Surveillance Center, which selected Dahlgren to be at the center of the laboratory's growing computer advances. It was around this time that Dahlgren became heavily involved with the development of Fleet Ballistic Missiles, later called Submarine-Launched Ballistic Missiles.

In the 1970s and 1980s, Dahlgren was on the leading edge of naval surface weapons work with programs such as the Tomahawk missile, which improved the Navy's capacity to perform attacks on land targets from a distance that decreased the risk to ships. Dahlgren also was critical in work to protect Navy ships from enemy missile and air attacks with programs such as the Standard missile and the Aegis Combat System. That work continues in 2017, along with the electromagnetic railgun, DDG 1000, Littoral Combat Ship (LCS), and Chemical Biological and Radiological Defense.

Because of the laboratory's broad-based growth in research and development and with its new missions, Dahlgren's name officially changed to the Naval Weapons Laboratory in 1959. It was later changed to the Naval Surface Weapons Center in 1974 with the merger of the former Naval Ordnance Laboratory at White Oak, Maryland. In 1987, the name was changed again to the Naval Surface Warfare Center as new and expanded missions were added. And, in 1992, with the consolidations of naval laboratories into one headquarters center, it became the Dahlgren Division of the Naval Surface Warfare Center.

Research and development
NSWCDD conducts basic research in all systems-related areas and pursues scientific disciplines including biotechnology, chemistry, mathematics, laser and computer technology, chemical, mechanical, electrical and systems engineering, physics and computer science. Distinguished figures who have worked for the NSWCDD include physicists Albert Einstein, Edward Teller, Carl Norden, and computer pioneers Howard Aiken and Grace Hopper.

Engineering projects of historical or military significance developed at NSWCDD include the triggering device on the Hiroshima atomic bomb, the Norden Bombsight used on most American bombers such as the B-17 Flying Fortress, B-24 Liberator and B-29 Superfortress during World War II, the Standard missile used on modern United States Navy warships, and the warhead for the AIM-54 Phoenix. Current projects include the majority of US research into directed-energy weapons, railgun technology and weapons integration for the Littoral combat ship.

STEM outreach
NSWCDD scientists and engineers share their technological expertise by participating in science, technology, engineering, and mathematics (STEM) activities to inspire students to pursue technical careers. NSWCDD mentors support summer academies, such as the Virginia Demonstration Project, where they introduce robotics and basic engineering principles to area middle and high school students through hands-on activities.  NSWCDD also has educational partnerships with several universities across the U.S.

Education
The Department of Defense Education Activity (DoDEA), which serves as the local school district for the base, has an K-8 school, Dahlgren Elementary Middle School. The school first opened in 1921. The school's principal facility was built during World War II. In 2011 a review of the building found that it was in "poor" shape.

King George County Public Schools operates non-DoDEA public schools in King George County. Most off-post persons associated with NSF Dahlgren send their children to King George County schools. The King George County school Potomac Elementary School is in proximity to the entrance to NSWC Dahlgren. King George High School is the local county high school.

Aircraft projects
NSRDC BQM-108

See also
Dahlgren Railroad Heritage Trail
List of United States Navy airfields

References

Further reading
James P. Rife and Rodney P. Carlisle (2007) The Sound of Freedom: Naval Weapons Technology at Dahlgren, VA 1918–2006

External links
NSWCDD website
NSWCDD DNA Website
Dahlgren Heritage Museum

Systems command installations of the United States Navy
Military installations in Virginia
King George County, Virginia
Military installations in Maryland
Military Superfund sites
Superfund sites in Virginia
1918 establishments in Virginia